Squadron Leader Bob Johnson (4 November 1917 – 30 October 2014) was a Canadian fighter pilot with the Royal Canadian Air Force during World War II. Johnson was awarded the Military Cross for his success in evading the Japanese for 23 days after being shot down in Burma.

References

1917 births
2014 deaths
Royal Canadian Air Force personnel of World War II
Canadian recipients of the Military Cross
Royal Canadian Air Force officers